Weebly is a web hosting service, headquartered in San Francisco. Weebly is a subsidiary of Block, Inc.

History
Weebly was founded in 2006 by Chief Executive Officer David Rusenko, Chief Technology Officer Chris Fanini, and former Chief Product Officer Dan Veltri. Rusenko and Fanini both attended the College of Information Sciences and Technology at Pennsylvania State University (Penn State). Veltri attended the university's Smeal College of Business. At the time, Penn State required all students to maintain an Internet portfolio, so they built upon this idea and created software that made it easy for anyone to build a personal website.

Formal development of Weebly began in January 2006. The invitational beta release was announced in June 2006. The official private-beta launched in September 2006.

In 2007, Weebly raised a US$650,000 financing round from several angel investors, including Ron Conway, Steve Anderson, Mike Maples, and Paul Buchheit. In 2011, Weebly raised a growth-stage round from Sequoia Capital and added Roelof Botha to its board of directors. In April 2014, Weebly raised $35 million in Series C funding from Sequoia Capital and Tencent Holdings Ltd.

In early 2018, co-founder Dan Veltri left the company to pursue other interests.

Features 
In March 2007, Weebly re-launched with its "WYSIWYG" editing interface. In 2008 Weebly added "Pro" accounts and Google AdSense monetization features, as well as compatibility with Google Chrome and Safari. In 2010, the company added French, Italian, Spanish, and Chinese languages. In April 2016, Weebly integrated JotForm software on its services. On October 1, 2015, Weebly Carbon was released to allow plugin integration among other features. In 2016, Weebly began to focus in on its ecommerce offerings with the release of Weebly 4 and Weebly Promote, an integrated marketing tool.

As more sellers began using the company, the company created features for one click taxes, integrations with Shippo to streamline the shipping process, Facebook Ad creator, integrated email marketing and lead capture, abandoned cart features, the release of Mobile 5.0 to help sellers run their store from anywhere and deep integrations with Square payment processing.

During its initial startup years, Weebly received criticism for its lack of CSS/HTML editing support, and in 2009 added this functionality.

Offices 
Rusenko stated in August 2013 that the company signed a lease for a  warehouse in San Francisco, based on an expectation of ongoing growth. The new office will house the majority of a global team of 600 employees in 2014 when it moves into the property. As of August 25, 2013, Weebly had 80 employees and was based in an  space in the Pacific Heights area of San Francisco. In October 2015, Weebly announced it would open a Berlin office in late 2015/early 2016 to offer European-based support and marketing.

Acquisition by Square
On April 26, 2018, Square, Inc. (now known as Block, Inc.) announced it would acquire Weebly for approximately $365 million in cash and stock. On acquisition in April 2018, Weebly had "millions of customers and more than 625,000 paid subscribers. The Weebly acquisition was completed on June 4, 2018.

Product
Weebly's free online website creator uses a widget-based site builder that operates in the web browser. All the site elements are drag-and-drop, and it automatically generates a mobile version of each website. Storage is unlimited, but the service restricts individual file sizes.  Consumers are given the option to have any url ending in .weebly.com, .com, .net, .org, .co, .info, or .us.  (example.weebly.com)

Android and iPhone apps are available that allow users to monitor their website traffic statistics, update blog posts and respond to comments, and add or update products if the user has an e-commerce online store. Basic features for blogging and e-Commerce are supported: as of 2018, site owners could develop simple stores with payments through either PayPal, Stripe or Authorize.net. Users can choose to incorporate advertisements in their pages, and visitor statistics can be tracked through an in-house tracking tool or Google Analytics. Weebly also has integrated newsletter marketing features.

As of 2020, Weebly was offered in 15 languages: English, French, Spanish, Italian, German, Portuguese, Polish, Norwegian, Dutch, Danish, Swedish, Chinese, Japanese, Russian and Turkish.

Public relations and sponsorship
In April 2012, Weebly co-sponsored a hackathon hosted by Pennsylvania State University titled the "PSUhackathon." Rusenko and Fanini, who are both alumni of the College of Information Sciences and Technology, spoke at and judged the event.

Awards and recognition
TIME listed Weebly among the 50 Best Websites of 2007. In 2011, Business Insider included Weebly into its "15 Cool New Apps That Are Crushing It On Chrome" list. Also in 2011, David Rusenko, Weebly's CEO and co-founder, earned a spot in Forbes "30 Under 30: social/mobile" list.

Censorship
In December 2014, the Indian government blocked Weebly in India, due to fears that ISIS propaganda was being spread through the site. On December 31, the site was again made available throughout India.

Weebly also applies censorship to its availability with a wide selection of geoblocked countries where Weebly is unavailable to internet users. Site owners are unable to login from these geoblocked locations to administer the site just as internet users cannot reach the site. According to Weebly official support forum, the exact list of blocked countries is secret, but the employees confirmed blocking of Côte d'Ivoire, Iran, Russia, Turkey, Ukraine, as well as much of Middle East, West and Central Africa.

See also
 Website builder

References

External links
 

2006 establishments in Pennsylvania
Block, Inc.
Companies' terms of service
Free web hosting services
Internet properties established in 2006
Web development software
Web hosting
Y Combinator companies
2018 mergers and acquisitions